This is a list of notable medical doctors in Nazi Germany.

When the Nazi government came to power it purged Germany of its 6,000 to 7,000 Jewish doctors.
Reportedly more than 7% of all German physicians became members of the Nazi party during World War II, a far higher percentage than the general population.  In 1942 more than 38,000 German doctors, half the total number of doctors, had joined the Nazi party. While most of these doctors were physicians, some held doctorates (PhDs) in biology, anthropology, or related fields.

Doctors who were working for the state, and not for their patients, using a Mendelian type of logic chart, saw extermination of their patients as the correct solution to the problem of mental illness and the genetically defective.

"The participation in the ‘betrayal of Hippocrates’ had a broad basis within the German medical profession. Without the doctors' active help, the Holocaust could not have happened." wrote E Ernst in the International Journal of Epidemiology.

Psychiatrist Ernst Rüdin was the founder of the psychiatric genetics field and was also a founder of the German racial hygiene movement.

Killing and experimentation became medical procedures as they were performed by licensed doctors. A doctor was present at all the mass killings for legal reasons. During the Doctors' trial, the defense argued that there was no international law to distinguish between legal and illegal human experimentation, which led to the creation of the Nuremberg Code (1947).

After the war, the German Medical Association blamed Nazi atrocities on a small group of 350 criminal doctors.

After Nazi Germany surrendered, some doctors attempted to change names to escape capture and trial, such as Werner Heyde and Robert Ley, Other doctors, such as Walter Schreiber, were covertly moved to the United States during "Operation Paperclip" in 1951.

The following are alphabetical lists of World War II physicians who were members of the Nazi Party. Some of those listed here were acquitted of the more serious charges, but were still found guilty for other crimes.

Euthanasia

Human experimentation

Others

Academics

Camp doctors

Miscellaneous

Non Nazis
The following people were never members of the Nazi Party, but their names are included here because they are known to have contributed to it.

See also

Articles
 Action 14f13
 Collaboration with the Axis powers
 Glossary of Nazi Germany
 The Holocaust
 Holocaust victims
 Mass suicides in 1945 Nazi Germany
 Nazi eugenics
 Responsibility for the Holocaust

Lists
 List of Axis personnel indicted for war crimes
 List of major perpetrators of the Holocaust
 List of medical eponyms with Nazi associations
 List of most-wanted Nazi war criminals
 List of Nazi concentration camps
 List of Nazi extermination camps and euthanasia centers
 List of Nazi Party leaders and officials

Notes

References

Aktion T4

Lists of people by activity
Doctors
Doctors